The 2013 AFL draft consisted of six opportunities for player acquisitions throughout the 2013–14 Australian Football League (AFL) off-season. This included the 2013 free agency period (4–18 October), 2013 trade period (7–25 October), three separate delisted player free agency periods (1–25 November), the 2013 national draft held at the Gold Coast Convention Centre (21 November), as well as the 2014 pre-season and rookie drafts (27 November).

Player movements

Free agency

Compensation draft picks
The following compensation draft picks were dispensed to four clubs by the AFL based on all restricted and unrestricted free agency transfers during the initial transfer window:
  – First-round selection (pick 11)
  – First-round selection (pick 19)
  – Second-round selection (pick 23)
  – Second-round selection (pick 25)

Trades

Note: The numbering of the draft picks in this trades table is based on the original order at the time of the trade. The number of the pick may have changed due to the allocation of Free Agency compensation picks or clubs not using later picks.

Retirements and delistings

2013 national draft
Following the completion of the free agency and trade periods, as well as the distribution of compensation picks to qualifying clubs, the final selection order for the 2013 National Draft was confirmed by the AFL on 18 November 2013.

 Compensation picks are selections in addition to the normal order of selection, allocated to clubs by the AFL as compensation for losing uncontracted players to the new expansion clubs, Gold Coast and Greater Western Sydney.  The picks can be held for up to five years and clubs declare at the beginning of the season of their intent to utilise the pick at the end of the season.  Picks could be traded to other clubs in return for players or other draft selections.
 Free agency compensation picks are additional selections awarded to teams based on their net loss of players during the free agency trade period.
 Promoted rookies are players who are transferred from a club's rookie list to their primary list.
 Local talent selections are local zone selections available to the new expansion clubs.

2014 pre-season draft

2014 rookie draft

References

Australian Football League draft
Draft
AFL Draft
AFL Draft
2010s in Queensland
Australian rules football in Queensland
Sport on the Gold Coast, Queensland
Events in Queensland